Jacques Fournier (5 May 1929 – 14 August 2021) was a French government official.

Biography
Fournier spent his childhood and studies in French Algeria. He was a student at the École nationale d'administration from 1951 to 1953 and subsequently served as a legal advisor at the French Embassy in Morocco from 1961 to 1964. He then served as a Conseiller d'État and was on Plan Commission. He then served as President of Gaz de France from 1986 to 1988. He subsequently served as President of SNCF from 24 August 1988 to 1 March 1993.

Jacques Fournier died on 14 August 2021 at the age of 92.

Publications
Politique de l'éducation (1972)
Traité du social (1976)
Le Pouvoir du social (1979)
Le Travail gouvernemental (1987)
Le Train, l’Europe et le service public (1993)
Critique de la raison communautaire (1996)
Livre blanc sur le dialogue social dans la fonction publique (2002)
Itinéraire d’un fonctionnaire engagé (2008)
L'Économie des besoins (2013)

References

1929 births
2021 deaths
French politicians
Socialist Party (France) politicians
École nationale d'administration alumni
SNCF people
People from Épinal